is a Turkish football club located in Sancaktepe, Turkey.

History 
The club was founded in 2008 under the name , and changed its name to  the following season as they were promoted to the TFF Third League. In the 2016–17 season, under the name , the club gained promotion into the TFF Second League.

Colours and badge 
The club's colours are red and white.

Current squad

Honours
TFF Third League: 2016–17

References

External links 
 Sancaktepe FK Official website
 TFF Profile

Football clubs in Turkey
Association football clubs established in 2008
Sport in Sancaktepe